Joachim Johansson defeated Ivan Ljubičić 7–5, 6–4 to win the 2005 Open 13 singles competition. Dominik Hrbatý was the defending champion.

Seeds

  Guillermo Coria (first round)
  David Nalbandian (second round)
  Joachim Johansson (champion)
  Nikolay Davydenko (first round)
  Dominik Hrbatý (first round)
  Feliciano López (semifinals)
  Nicolas Kiefer (first round)
  Ivan Ljubičić (final)

Draw

Finals

Top half

Bottom half

External links
 2005 Open 13 Singles draw
 2005 Open 13 Qualifying draw

Open 13
Open 13